Dzmitry Vasilyevich Zhyrmont (born 1 March 1989, in Minsk) is a Belarusian tennis player and tennis coach

Zhyrmont has a career high ATP singles ranking of 201 achieved on 22 July 2013. He also has a career high ATP doubles ranking of 281 achieved on 11 November 2013.

Zhyrmont has represented Belarus at the Davis Cup where he has a W/L record of 3–6.

At the 2013 Wimbledon Championships, Zhyrmont contested the qualifying event where he reached the last round of qualifying defeating Radu Albot and Paul Capdeville in the previous rounds. In the final round he faced Stéphane Robert, where he lost 4–6, 6–1, 6–3, 4–6, 4–6.

ATP Challenger and ITF Futures finals

Singles: 27 (14–13)

Doubles: 24 (14–10)

References

External links

1989 births
Living people
Belarusian male tennis players
Tennis players from Minsk
21st-century Belarusian people